The Brunei national basketball team  represents Brunei in international basketball competitions and is managed by the Brunei Basketball Association (BBA).

Competitions

FIBA Asia Cup

Current roster 
Roster at the FIBA Asia Cup 2021 SEABA Pre-Qualifier.

 

|}
| valign="top" |
 Head coach

  
 

Legend
(C) Team captain
Club field describes current pro club
|}

Coaches
  Bennett Palad (2003–2008)
  Kevin Reece (2010–2014)
  Nomar Angeles Isla (2014–)

Honors

Regional
Borneo Cup
 Champions: 2011
 Silver medalists: 2012

Others
Mum's Bakery Cup (Sultan's Cup)
 Champions: 2011, 2012

References

External links
Brunei Basketball facebook
Rank at fiba.com
Asiabasket.com - Brunei Men National Team 

Men's national basketball teams
Basketball
1970 establishments in Brunei